St Mirren Football Club is a Scottish association football club based in Paisley. The club first competed in a European competition in 1980–81, entering the UEFA Cup following a third-place finish in the Scottish Premier Division. The club reached the second round, which remains the club's joint best run in a UEFA competition.

History

1980–81 UEFA Cup
St Mirren secured a third-place finish in the Scottish Premier Division behind Aberdeen and Celtic in the 1979–80 season which qualified the club to enter the first round of the UEFA Cup the following season, along with fellow Scottish club Dundee United. Their first opponents were IF Elfsborg, of Sweden. St Mirren won the first leg 2–1 at Ryavallen, and the two clubs played out a 0–0 draw at Love Street. This was enough to send the Scottish club through to the second round. The club faced French side AS Saint-Étienne with the first leg resulting in a similar 0–0 draw in Paisley. In the away leg St Mirren were defeated 2–0 at Stade Geoffroy-Guichard to end their European début.

1983–84 UEFA Cup
Following their début in the UEFA Cup three seasons beforehand, St Mirren similarly qualified for the competition in 1983–84 through their league ranking. The club faced Feyenoord of the Netherlands in the first round. In the first leg they went 1–0 down at home and were defeated in a similar fashion at the Feijenoord Stadion in Rotterdam in the away leg 2–0, rounding off a 3–0 aggregate defeat.

1985–86 UEFA Cup
With a fifth-place finish in the Scottish Premier Division St Mirren qualified for the UEFA Cup for a third time. In the first round they were drawn against Czechoslovakian team SK Slavia Prague. In the first leg at Stadion Evžena Rošického St Mirren were narrowly defeated 1–0. In the return leg in Scotland the match ended 1–0 after 90 minutes but this time in favour of St Mirren which forced the match into extra time. The home team went on to score two goals and win the match 3–0 on the night at Love Street and 3–1 on aggregate to progress to the second round. Hammarby IF of Sweden were the opponents in the second round and the two clubs played out a 3–3 draw in the first leg at Söderstadion in Stockholm. In the return leg, St Mirren were defeated 2–1 on the night and 5–4 on aggregate.

1987–88 European Cup Winners' Cup
St Mirren's last entry to date in a UEFA organised competition is the 1987–88 European Cup Winners' Cup which they qualified as Scottish Cup winners from the previous season. The club faced Tromsø IL of Norway in the first round. St Mirren won the first leg 1–0 at Love Street and the second leg at Alfheim Stadion ended 0–0 which was enough to send the club through. Their second round opponents were KV Mechelen from Belgium. In the first leg the match ended 0–0 in Mechelen but St Mirren were defeated 2–0 at home in the return leg and were thus eliminated. KV Mechelen went on to be surprise winners of the tournament in their European début.

Overall record

By competition

By country

References

European football
Scottish football clubs in international competitions